Fredrick Elroy Goldsmith (May 15, 1856 – March 28, 1939) was a right-handed pitcher in 19th-century professional baseball in both the U.S. and Canada. In his prime, Goldsmith was six-foot-one-inch tall and weighed 195 pounds.

The Great Curveball Debate: Goldsmith or Cummings?
Invention of the curveball is widely credited to Candy Cummings. However, another claimant was Fred Goldsmith, Cummings' rival when the two played in the International Association for Professional Base Ball Players in 1877–78—Goldsmith with the pennant-winning London Tecumsehs and Cummings with the Lynn, Massachusetts, Live Oaks. Cummings was also the first president of the International Association when he pitched for and managed the Lynn Live Oaks.

In his biography of Cummings, Stephen Katz describes Cummings' invention of the curveball in the early 1860s and his first known use of the pitch in 1867, when he pitched for the Brooklyn Excelsiors in a game in Cambridge, Massachusetts, against the Harvard College team.

Goldsmith maintained that he gave a demonstration of the pitch on August 16, 1870, at the Capitoline Grounds in Brooklyn, New York, and that renown sportswriter Henry Chadwick had covered it in the Brooklyn Eagle on August 17, 1870. However, Stephen Katz, in his biography of Cummings, shows that Goldsmith's claim was not credible, and that Goldsmith's reference to an article by Chadwick in the Brooklyn Eagle was likely fabricated.

Nevertheless, some writers in the first half of the twentieth century credited Goldsmith with having invented the curveball. Sportscaster-American actor Bill Stern waded into the debate in 1949 with a "favorite story" firmly crediting Goldsmith as the inventor and with transforming baseball. (See Bill Stern on the curveball.)

Additionally, an article in The London Free Press (Fred Goldsmith Invented The Curveball) of June 21, 1939, credits Goldsmith with inventing the curveball and says that "Just three days following Fred Goldsmith's death [on March 28, 1939], The Sporting News devoted an editorial to Goldsmith's feat of 61 years ago and asked that he be officially recognized as the inventor of the curve ball." However, The Sporting News article says no such thing. Instead, it states: "Nearly all the authorities give the distinction of discovering and perfecting the curve ball to Cummings ..." 

Further, an article in the August 2, 1938, London Free Press (Nick Altrock Is Here For Today) indicates that former Major League pitcher Nick Altrock also believed that Goldsmith invented the curveball. Altrock and Goldsmith were in London, Ontario, for an Old Boys Reunion and afternoon game at Labatt Park between a team from Battle Creek, Michigan, and a London Seniors team.

Ironically, Cummings was elected to the Baseball Hall of Fame in Cooperstown, New York in 1939—the same year that Goldsmith died.

Goldsmith's professional career
During his lifetime, Goldsmith pitched professionally for the New Haven New Havens (1875); the London Tecumsehs (in 1876, before the Tecumsehs joined the International Association) and after the Tecumsehs joined the fledgling International Association (1877–78); the Troy, New York Trojans of the National League (1879); the Chicago White Stockings of the National League (1880–1884) and briefly for the Baltimore Orioles of the American Association (1884).

Pitching for the Chicago White Stockings, Goldsmith had four seasons with 20 wins or more: 1880 (21–3); 1881 (24–13); 1882 (28–17); 1883 (25–19).

Goldsmith's win–loss percentage of .622 (112–68) does not include his games in New Haven or in London, Ontario, Canada, with the International Association pennant winners, the London Tecumsehs.

During Goldsmith's five-season stint pitching for the Chicago White Stockings, he played with first baseman Cap Anson and for team President A.G. Spalding, when Chicago won several league pennants. Goldsmith's final game in the pro ranks was on September 10, 1884.

Images of Fred Goldsmith

References

 Bill Stern's Favorite Baseball Stories by Bill Stern, (Blue Ribbon Books, Garden City, New York, 1949).
 Fred Goldsmith Invented The Curve Ball by Howard Broughton, assistant sports editor, The London Free Press, June 21, 1939.
 Nick Altrock Is Here For Today by Howard Broughton, The London Free Press, August 2, 1938.
 Cheering for the Home Team: The Story of Baseball in Canada by William Humber, (The Boston Mills Press, 1983).
 Old Time Baseball and the London Tecumsehs of the late 1870s by Les Bronson, a recorded (and later transcribed) talk given to the London & Middlesex Historical Society on February 15, 1972. Available in the London Room of the London Public Library, Main Branch.
 Some Baseball History, Both Amateur and Professional, in the City of London, Synopsis of Tecumsehs, the Renowned Champions of Early Days by Frank Adams, for 58 years a member of The London Advertiser staff, pages  214–217 of The Canadian Science Digest, March, 1938, published monthly in London, Ontario, Canada, by Walter Venner.

External links
 Baseball-Reference.com
 Twenty-Wins-Plus Club, National League pitchers, 1876–1889
 Cummings lands in the Hall of Fame for "his" invention the year Goldsmith dies (1939)
 

Major League Baseball pitchers
19th-century baseball players
New Haven Elm Citys players
Troy Trojans players
Chicago White Stockings players
Baltimore Orioles players
Baseball players from New Haven, Connecticut
1856 births
1939 deaths
London Tecumseh players
Springfield (minor league baseball) players